Volker Fried (born 1 February 1961 in Osnabrück, Niedersachsen) is a former field hockey player from West Germany, who competed at four consecutive Summer Olympics for West and the reunified Germany. He won the gold medal with his team at the 1992 Summer Olympics in Barcelona, after capturing silver at the two previous Olympics in Los Angeles (1984) and Seoul (1988).

Fried earned a total number of 290 international caps for his native country, in the years between 1980 and 1996. He retired from the international scene after the 1996 Summer Olympics in Atlanta, Georgia. After his active career he became a hockey coach at Düsseldorfer HC.

References
sports-reference

External links
 

1961 births
Living people
German male field hockey players
German field hockey coaches
Olympic field hockey players of Germany
Olympic field hockey players of West Germany
Field hockey players at the 1984 Summer Olympics
Field hockey players at the 1988 Summer Olympics
Field hockey players at the 1992 Summer Olympics
Field hockey players at the 1996 Summer Olympics
Olympic gold medalists for Germany
Olympic silver medalists for West Germany
Olympic medalists in field hockey
Medalists at the 1992 Summer Olympics
Medalists at the 1988 Summer Olympics
Medalists at the 1984 Summer Olympics
1990 Men's Hockey World Cup players
Sportspeople from Osnabrück